Maithripala may refer to 
Maithripala Sirisena, President of Sri Lanka.
Maithripala Senanayake, Sri Lankan politician.

Sinhalese masculine given names